Busyu-ko Dam is an earthfill dam located in Fukui Prefecture in Japan. The dam is used for power production. The catchment area of the dam is 9 km2. The dam impounds about 19  ha of land when full and can store 2261 thousand cubic meters of water. The construction of the dam was started on 1916 and completed in 1920.

References

Dams in Fukui Prefecture
1920 establishments in Japan